Derocrania is a genus of beetles in the family Cicindelidae, containing the following species:

 Derocrania agnes (W. Horn, 1905)
 Derocrania brevicollis (W. Horn, 1905)
 Derocrania concinna Chaudoir, 1860
 Derocrania dembickyi Naviaus & J. Moravec, 2001
 Derocrania flavicornis W. Horn, 1892
 Derocrania fusiformis (W. Horn, 1904)
 Derocrania gibbiceps Chaudoir, 1860
 Derocrania halyi (W. Horn, 1900)
 Derocrania honorei Fleutiaux, 1893
 Derocrania intricatorugulosa (W. Horn, 1942)
 Derocrania jaechi Naviaux, 2002
 Derocrania longesulcata (W. Horn, 1900)
 Derocrania nematodes (Schaum, 1863)
 Derocrania nietneri (Motchulsky, 1859)
 Derocrania schaumi W. Horn, 1892
 Derocrania scitiscabra (Walker, 1859)

References

Cicindelidae